Bottineau Municipal Airport  is a public airport located one mile (1.6 km) east of the central business district of Bottineau, in Bottineau County, North Dakota, United States. It is owned by the Bottineau Airport Authority.

Facilities and aircraft

 Runway 13/31: 3,700 x 60 ft (1,128 x 18 m), surface: asphalt
 Runway 3/21: 2,000 x 150 ft (610 x 46 m), surface: asphalt

For the 12-month period ending July 23, 2007, the airport had 4,720 aircraft operations: 93% general aviation, 5% air taxi, and 2% military.

Notes

External links

Airports in North Dakota
Buildings and structures in Bottineau County, North Dakota
Transportation in Bottineau County, North Dakota